Sufivand (also Romanized as Şūfīvand; also known as Şūfīyehvand) is a village in Howmeh Rural District, in the Central District of Harsin County, Kermanshah Province, Iran. At the 2006 census, its population was 467, in 87 families.

References 

Populated places in Harsin County